CoRoT-20b is a transiting exoplanet found by the CoRoT space telescope in 2011.

It is a hot Jupiter-sized planet orbiting a G2V star with Te = 5880K, M = 1.14M☉, R = 0.92R☉, and above-solar metallicity. It is a young planet, with an estimated age between 0.06 and 0.14 Gyr. Its density (8.87 g/cm3) is remarkably high for its mass, making COROT-20b one of the most compact gas giants.

See also
COROT-20c
COROT-14b
WASP-18b

References

Hot Jupiters
Transiting exoplanets
Exoplanets discovered in 2011
20b